金山 (literally Gold Mountain) may refer to:

Hong Kong
Kam Shan Country Park (金山郊野公園)

Japan
Kanayama, a surname (including a list of people with the surname)
Kanayama Station (Aichi), of Nagoya, Aichi Prefecture
Kanayama Station (Fukuoka), of Fukuoka, Fukuoka Prefecture
Kanayama Station (Hokkaido), of Sorachi District, Hokkaido
Kaneyama, Fukushima, a town in Fukushima Prefecture
Kaneyama, Gifu, formerly a town in Gifu Prefecture
Kaneyama, Yamagata, a town in Yamagata Prefecture
Kaneyama, Hyogo, a mountain in Hyogo Prefecture

Mainland China
Jinshan District (金山区), Shanghai
Mount Jin (Zhenjiang), mountain in Zhenjiang, Jiangsu
Jinshan Subdistrict (金山街道), name of various subdistricts in the PRC
Jinshan Subdistrict, Fuzhou, in Cangshan District, Fuzhou, Fujian
Jinshan Subdistrict, Xiamen, in Huli District, Xiamen, Fujian
Jinshan Subdistrict, Gaozhou, Guangdong
Jinshan Subdistrict, Meizhou, in Meijiang District, Meizhou, Guangdong
Jinshan Subdistrict, Chaozhou, in Xiangqiao District, Chaozhou, Guangdong
Jinshan Subdistrict, Fuquan, Guizhou
Jinshan Subdistrict, Yichun, Heilongjiang, in Jinshantun District, Yichun, Heilongjiang
Jinshan Subdistrict, Hebi, in Qibin District, Hebi, Henan
Jinshan Subdistrict, Daye, Hubei
Jinshan Subdistrict, Zhuzhou, in Hetang District, Zhuzhou, Hunan
Jinshan Subdistrict, Zhenjiang, in Runzhou District, Zhenjiang, Jiangsu
Jinshan Subdistrict, Xuzhou, in Quanshan District, Xuzhou, Jiangsu
Jinshan Subdistrict, Benxi, in Mingshan District, Benxi, Liaoning
Towns named Jinshan (金山镇)
Jinshan, Nanchuan District, Chongqing
Jinshan, Dazu County, Chongqing
Jinshan, Nanjing County, Fujian
Jinshan, Guyang County, Inner Mongolia
Jinshan, Ganyu County, Jiangsu
Jinshan, Dandong, in Yuanbao District, Dandong, Liaoning
Jinshan, Leshan, in Wutongtiao District, Leshan, Sichuan
Jinshan, Luojiang County, Sichuan
Jinshan, Shangli County, Zhejiang
Jinshan Township (disambiguation) (金山乡), which currently refers only to mainland divisions
Kingsoft, software developer

Taiwan
Jinshan District, New Taipei (金山區), in New Taipei, Republic of China (Taiwan)

United States
San Francisco, California (舊金山)

See also
Gold Mountain (disambiguation)
Jinshan (disambiguation)